José Luis Sérsic (6 May 1933 – 19 July 1993) was an Argentine astronomer who studied the morphology of galaxies. He is most widely known for the mathematical model of galaxy brightness, the Sersic profile, which bears his name. José Luis Sérsic first published his law in 1963.

The asteroid 2691 Sersic is named in his honour.

References

20th-century Argentine astronomers
Argentine people of Croatian descent
1933 births
1993 deaths